Wiar or Vihor is a left tributary of the San River in southeastern Poland and Ukraine. It flows for 70.4 kilometres, and joins the San near Przemyśl.

Tributaries
Left
 Zalissia River

Right
 Bibiska
 Mala Vyrva
 Bukhta
 Vyrva
 Arlamivka (left)
 Chyzhka (right)

References

Rivers of Lviv Oblast
Rivers of Podkarpackie Voivodeship
Rivers of Poland